The Hunter 36-2 is an American sailboat, that was designed by Glenn Henderson and first built in 2008.

The Hunter 36-2 is a development of the slightly smaller 2000 model Hunter 356.

The design was sold as the Hunter 36 but is now usually referred to as the 36-2 to differentiate it from the unrelated 1980 Hunter 36. It can also be confused with the 1990 Hunter 36 Vision and the 2001 Hunter 36 Legend, all sailboats with similar names by the same builder.

Production
The boat was built by Hunter Marine in the United States, but it is now out of production.

Design

The Hunter 36-2 is a small recreational keelboat, built predominantly of fiberglass. It has a B&R rig, an internally-mounted spade-type rudder, a reverse transom, mast-furling mainsail and a fixed fin keel. It displaces  and carries  of ballast.

See also
List of sailing boat types

Related development
Hunter 356

Similar sailboats
Alberg 37
Baltic 37
Beneteau 361
C&C 36-1
C&C 36R
C&C 37
C&C 110
Catalina 36
Columbia 36
Coronado 35
Dickerson 37
Dockrell 37
Ericson 36
Express 37
Frigate 36
Hunter 36
Hunter 36 Legend
Hunter 36 Vision
Invader 36
Islander 36
Marlow-Hunter 37
Nonsuch 36
Nor'Sea 37
Portman 36
S2 11.0
Seidelmann 37
Watkins 36
Watkins 36C

References

External links

Keelboats
2000s sailboat type designs
Sailing yachts
Sailboat type designs by Glenn Henderson
Sailboat types built by Hunter Marine